Cutcliffe is a surname. Notable people with the surname include:

C. J. Cutcliffe Hyne (1866–1944), English novelist
David Cutcliffe (born 1954), American college football coach
Marg Cutcliffe (born 1955), Canadian female curler
Sinclair Cutcliffe (1930–2007), Canadian politician

See also
Catcliffe
Cotcliffe
Cutcliffe Peak